Manuel Amado Tavares (born 20 December 1974), commonly known as Tavarinho, is a São Toméan footballer who plays as a defender for UD Rei Amador and the São Tomé and Príncipe national team.

International career
Tavarinho made his international debut for São Tomé and Príncipe on 13 June 2015.

References

External links

1974 births
Living people
Association football defenders
São Tomé and Príncipe footballers
São Tomé and Príncipe international footballers
UDRA players